Juba Teaching Hospital is a government-run 512-bed teaching hospital in Juba, South Sudan. The hospital functions as the ultimate referral hospital for the nation.

Services 
The hospital provides secondary level care for Central Equatoria state and functions as the ultimate referral hospital for the entire nation, serving the needs of 8.26 million people in 2020. Services include primary care,  an emergency department, obstetrics and gynaecology, neonatal intensive care, surgery, and vaccinations. The maternity ward has thirteen beds.

History 
The teaching hospital was opened by the Government of Sudan in 1975 and is affiliated with the University of Juba.

The International Comittee of the Red Cross (ICRC) provided the hospital with a laboratory and X-ray facilities in 1993. As of 2006, ICRC support continued and the hospital employed 400 nursing staff, including 230 students. From 2006 to 2008 the hospital underwent renovations by the China Overseas Engineering Group. During 2016, the hospital ran out of medicine, had no electrical supply and was barely functioning.

The hospital opened an 2,500-litres-per-day oxygen plant in 2021 With support from the Government of China, services expanded in 2021 to include an infectious disease department and increased intensive care capacity. The Israeli government added support to the Intensive Care Unit in 2022.

The hospital is considered to be the best in the nation.

See also 
 List of hospitals in South Sudan
 Health in South Sudan

References 

1975 establishments
Hospitals in South Sudan
1975 establishments in Sudan
Hospitals established in 1975
Buildings and structures in Juba